DISR is a four-letter acronym that may stand for:

 German International School Riyadh
 Department of Industry, Science and Resources
 Department of Industry, Science and Resources (1998–2001)